Labour for a Referendum (LfR) was a political campaign by members of the Labour Party that sought a referendum in the United Kingdom on the European Union. The movement was set up following a pledge by the Conservative Party to hold an in–out vote if re-elected in 2015 United Kingdom general election. In the election campaign, Labour Party policy was that such a referendum would be an unnecessary distraction from government priorities. Following the Conservative victory in that election, the Labour Party committed to supporting passage of a Referendum Bill through Parliament  thus achieving the result sought by this campaign.

The campaign was chaired by JML chairman and Labour party donor John Mills, and directed by Dominic Moffitt, with party support from over 50 councillors, three council leaders and MPs including Kate Hoey, John McDonnell and Keith Vaz, the campaign aimed to move the policy of the Labour Party to one which supports a referendum on membership of the EU, with the intention that this might help to secure a victory in the 2015 general election.

Former Northern Ireland spokesman Jim Dowd MP said: "I have been a supporter of this cause for many years and firmly believe the Labour Party must commit to a referendum before the European elections  next year. As the Tories tear themselves apart over this issue, Labour for a Referendum provides the opportunity to unite the party on giving the people a say on our future in the EU."

Notable supporters
After it launched in May 2013, it attracted support from a number of councillors, MPs and party activists.

Jim Dowd, MP for Lewisham West and Penge and former Northern Ireland spokesman
Keith Vaz, MP for Leicester East and former Europe minister
Kate Hoey, MP for Vauxhall 
John Cryer, MP for Leyton and Wanstead
Rosie Cooper, MP for West Lancashire
Graham Stringer, MP for Blackley and Broughton
Austin Mitchell, former MP for Great Grimsby
Lord Moonie, Member of the House of Lords
David Drew, former MP for Stroud
Kevin Meagher, associate editor of Labour Uncut
Owen Jones, Guardian columnist
Richard Wilson

Status following the 2015 general election
Following the May 2015 United Kingdom general election, the Labour Party declared that it would support the parliamentary bill for the 2016 United Kingdom European Union membership referendum, achieving the aim of the campaign. , the status of the group was unclear and its web site appeared to be closed.

References

European Union–related advocacy groups in the United Kingdom
Organisations associated with the Labour Party (UK)
Political organisations based in the United Kingdom
Political campaigns in the United Kingdom
2013 in British politics